Bobby Dean Coachman (born November 11, 1961, in Cottonwood, Alabama) is an American former professional baseball player who played part of one season for the California Angels of Major League Baseball (MLB). He was drafted in the 11th round of the 1984 MLB draft out of the University of South Alabama.

References

1961 births
Living people
African-American baseball players
American expatriate baseball players in Canada
American expatriate baseball players in Mexico
Anaheim Angels scouts
Baseball players from Alabama
California Angels players
Charros de Jalisco players
Edmonton Trappers players
Major League Baseball third basemen
Midland Angels players
Palm Springs Angels players
People from Houston County, Alabama
Phoenix Firebirds players
Quad Cities Angels players
Salem Angels players
Shreveport Captains players
South Alabama Jaguars baseball players
Tacoma Tigers players
Winnipeg Goldeyes players
Quad Cities River Bandits players
21st-century African-American people
20th-century African-American sportspeople